The Ambush near Suva Reka (Serbian: Zaseda kod Suve Reke) was an incident that occurred during the Kosovo War when members of the Kosovo Liberation Army (KLA) ambushed a MUP convoy, killing three Serbian policemen near the village of Dulje, close to Suva Reka. The three Serbian policemen were blown up by a rocket-propelled grenade that exploded on impact with their squad car.

Background 
The result of the ambush was due to Yugoslav troops shelling the village of Slapuzani.

Incident 
On 8 January 1999, the KLA led an ambush of a convoy of Yugoslav troops. In the incident, 4 policemen and 2 civilians were seriously wounded after a fierce firefight.

Aftermath
The KLA followed up the ambush with another attack on a Serbian police patrol near the village of Slivovo, killing one police officer. The village of Račak served as the staging area for these ambushes, resulting in a significant build up of Yugoslav Army forces and subsequent massacre on the village.

References 

Military operations of the Kosovo War
Battles involving FR Yugoslavia
1999 in Kosovo
Conflicts in 1999
Kosovo Liberation Army
